The 1952 New Brunswick general election was held on September 22, 1952, to elect 52 members to the 42nd New Brunswick Legislative Assembly, the governing house of the province of New Brunswick, Canada. The incumbent Liberals were defeated by the Progressive Conservatives.

References

1952 elections in Canada
Elections in New Brunswick
1952 in New Brunswick
September 1952 events in Canada